Mae Raeng is a village and tambon (subdistrict) of Pa Sang District, in Lamphun Province, Thailand. In 2005 it had a population of  7627 people. The tambon contains 11 villages.

References

Tambon of Lamphun province
Populated places in Lamphun province